Hoplistopsis is a genus of flies in the family Stratiomyidae.

Species
Hoplistopsis geminatus James, 1950

References

Stratiomyidae
Brachycera genera
Monotypic Brachycera genera
Diptera of Australasia